On the first tier, Vietnam is divided into 58 provinces and 5 municipalities. Municipalities are the highest-ranked cities in Vietnam. Municipalities are centrally-controlled cities and have special status equal to the province.

The municipalities are divided into urban districts (quận), municipal cities (thành phố thuộc thành phố trực thuộc trung ương), towns (thị xã) and rural districts (huyện) as the second-tier units. At the third tier, urban districts are divided into wards (phường), towns are divided into wards (phường) and communes (xã), while rural districts are divided into townships (thị trấn) and communes (xã).


Current municipalities

Future municipalities 
Đà Lạt (2030)

See also
 Provinces of Vietnam

References

Vietnam 1
Municipalities
 
Subdivisions of Vietnam
Vietnam geography-related lists